Changping North railway station, also known as Changpingbei railway station, is a railway station in Gulou North Street in the urban area of Changping District, Beijing. All services were stopped between June to October in 2016 to build a new station. This station became the new terminal of all long-distance trains whose terminal used to be Beijing North railway station. On , the suburban railway Huairou-Miyun line opened, and this station started to offer services for suburban railway passengers.

The renovation was for sparing the old Beijing-Baotou railway to build the Beijing–Zhangjiakou intercity railway.

See also 

 Beijing–Baotou railway
 Beijing North railway station

References 

Railway stations in China opened in 1980
Stations on the Beijing–Tongliao Railway